Misty is reportedly the name of a classified project by the United States National Reconnaissance Office (NRO) to operate stealthy reconnaissance satellites. The satellites are conjectured to be photo reconnaissance satellites and the program has been the subject of atypically public debates about its worthiness in the defense budget since December 2004. The estimated project costs in 2004 were, at the time of statement, US$9.5 billion (inflation adjusted US$ billion in ).

Launches 
The first satellite (USA-53 or 1990-019B, 19,600 kg) launched for the program was deployed on 1 March 1990 by the Space Shuttle Atlantis as part of Mission STS-36. Objects associated with the satellite decayed on 31 March 1990, but the satellite was seen and tracked later that year and in the mid-1990s by amateur observers. The second satellite (USA-144 or 1999-028A ) was launched on 22 May 1999, and by 2004 the launch of a third satellite was planned for 2009. Circumstantial evidence suggested that the third satellite might be the payload of the Delta IV Heavy launch designated NROL-15, which was launched in June 2012.

Criticism 
Porter Goss, a former Congressman and former CIA director, and George Tenet, former CIA director, have both vigorously supported successors to Misty, despite several attempts by Senators Dianne Feinstein and John D. Rockefeller IV to terminate the program. The primary contractor is Lockheed Martin Space Systems.

On 21 June 2007, the Associated Press reported that Director of National Intelligence John Michael McConnell had cancelled the Misty program. A spokesperson for McConnell confirmed that McConnell has the authority to cancel projects, but declined to comment further.

See also 
 Blackjack (satellite)
 Future Imagery Architecture
 KH-11

References

External links 
 Allen Thomson. Stealth Satellite Sourcebook (from Federation of American Scientists)
 GlobalSecurity.org article
 
 The Spy Satellite So Stealthy that the Senate Couldn't Kill It (Excerpt from The Wizards of Langley on MISTY)
 

Cold War military equipment of the United States
Lockheed Martin satellites and probes
Military equipment introduced in the 1990s
National Reconnaissance Office satellites
Reconnaissance satellites of the United States